Dalsfjorden is a fjord in Volda Municipality in Møre og Romsdal county, Norway. There are several small villages along the shores of the fjord, the largest of which are Dravlaus on the western shore, Steinsvika at the southern end of the fjord, and Dalsbygda on the eastern shore. County Road 40 runs around the shoreline of the whole fjord.

The old Dalsfjord Municipality (which existed from 1924-1964) encompassed the area surrounding this fjord.  Dalsfjord Church sits on the shore of the fjord in the village of Dravlaus, just south of the mouth of the fjord.

See also
 List of Norwegian fjords

References

Fjords of Møre og Romsdal
Volda